Robert Hungerford Preparatory High School was a segregated high school for African Americans in Eatonville, Florida. The school was founded by Professor and Mrs. Russell C. Calhoun in 1897. Eatonville was one of the first African American towns to incorporate in the United States. It closed in 2010.

Both the professor and his wife attended the Tuskegee Institute, of which the husband was a graduate. In the spring of 1898, along with the help of friends and relatives, Mr. E C. Hungerford donated to the school  of land. Mr. Hungerford of Chester, CT. owned a winter home in nearby Maitland, Florida. The land was donated in memory of his late doctor son, Robert, who died due to yellow fever. Robert had cared for a sick African American boy who no one else would help, even when Robert himself became ill.

The groundwork for the school was possible thanks to donors not only from Florida, but throughout the country. The first cash donation for Hungerford was given by Miss Mary Brown of Winter Park, and the second was $400 was through Booker T. Washington of Tuskegee. Later on Mr. George B. Cluett, the head manufacturer of Troy, New York, donated $8,000 towards the construction of a second building, and an additional $4,000 towards the purchase of an orange grove near campus. Although Cluett Hall was burned in 1922, it was replaced by a stone structure bearing the same name only a year and a half later. Cluett also contributed a major sum towards the dining hall, which he himself insisted be named Calhoun Hall. Additionally, he gave $500 annually towards expenses for a number of years.

By 1927, the school had expanded significantly. Originally only able to support a handful of students, the school now had over 100 boarding pupils, a number of day students, and also carried night classes for adults. A private school, Hungerford required each citizen to make personal arrangements in order to attend the institution. By 1938, Orange County began making arrangements for African American High School students of Winter Park to attend Hungerford, and commuted daily to the school by bus. Hungerford was a private school, offering grades 6 through 12 with dorms for both girls and boys. The institution was equipped with a "dining hall, chapel, library, manual training shops, laundry, home economics laboratory, barn, farm land and facilities for teaching business subjects."(Hall) It embraced both college preparatory and vocational, including subjects such as English, Latin, history, general science, biology, algebra, geometry, manual training (industrial arts), and home economics. The school also taught typing, bookkeeping, agriculture and physical education.

As the 20th century progressed, classes in technical subjects such as mechanical drawing and radio were added. As for extracurricular activities, Hungerford took part in interschool sports, such as football, basketball and track. To instill responsibility, students were assigned "jobs and chores" outside of the classroom. These tasks involved helping maintain the school's dairy, chicken coops, gardens, classrooms and dormitories. To give back to the communities of Eatonville and Winter Park for their involvement, it had weekly Sunday afternoon Choral Concerts that were open to the public.

In 1950, the Hungerford School became a public school administered by the Orange County School Board. The old, original campus buildings were replaced by new buildings. Today, the school still occupies a large parcel of land in Eatonville, just on the east side of the Interstate 4.

The school closed its doors in 2010.

Notable alumni
Deacon Jones – NFL defensive end, member of the Pro Football Hall of Fame

References

Additional sources
 Clyde W. Hall. 2005. An African-American Growing Up on the West Side of Winter Park, Florida 1925-1942
 Negro Educational Conference To Open Here On Monday (WP Herald) Feb 2, 1933
 Blackman, William Fremont. History of Orange County, Florida. Narrative and Biographical. DeLand, Florida, The E.O. Painter Printing Co., 1927
 The Orlando Sentinel, Sunday, March 4, 1990.

Educational institutions established in 1897
Historically segregated African-American schools in Florida
1897 establishments in Florida